Libědice is a municipality and village in Chomutov District in the Ústí nad Labem Region of the Czech Republic. It has about 200 inhabitants.

Administrative parts
The village of Čejkovice is an administrative part of Libědice.

References

Villages in Chomutov District